

Players

Seeds

Qualifiers

Lucky losers
  Sybille Bammer

Qualifying draw

First qualifier

Second qualifier

Third qualifier

Fourth qualifier

Fifth qualifier

Sixth qualifier

References
 Qualifying Draw

Wom
Medibank International Sydney - Women's qualifying